Butler County Community College (BC3) is a public community college in Butler Township, Pennsylvania. It also offers courses in Cranberry Township, as well as in Lawrence, Mercer, and Jefferson counties. More recently the college has begun to offer online classes. Over 100,000 students have attended. The college's main campus is easily accessed from PA Route 8 via Decatur Drive or Vogel and Old Plank Roads.

Locations
 BC3 Main Campus – Butler, PA (Butler County)
 BC3 @ Cranberry – Cranberry Township, PA. (Butler County)
 BC3 @ Lawrence Crossing – New Castle, PA (Lawrence County)
 BC3 @ Linden Pointe – Hermitage, PA (Mercer County)
 BC3 @ Brockway– Brockway, PA (Jefferson County)
 BC3 @ Armstrong - Ford City, PA (Armstrong County)

Students are able to take courses at multiple campuses if convenient. The 2011 spring semester is the first semester that the Upper Allegheny campus(es) offered courses. In September 2021, college administrators broke ground on a new campus facility in Ford City.

Academics
BC3 offers certificates and 2-year degrees in the fields of business, nursing and health, humanities and social sciences, and science and technology.

The college is institutionally accredited by the Middle States Commission on Higher Education. Specific programs are accredited by:

 Accreditation Council for Business Schools and Programs
 Accreditation Commission for Education in Nursing (ACEN)
 American Association of Medical Assistants
 BC3 Associate Degree Nursing Program
 BC3 Physical Therapist Assistant Program

Notable alumni
 Timothy L. Pesci (A.S. 1972) – Pennsylvania State Representative 1989–2000

References

External links
 Official website

Two-year colleges in the United States
Community colleges in Pennsylvania
Educational institutions established in 1965
Universities and colleges in Butler County, Pennsylvania
1965 establishments in Pennsylvania
NJCAA athletics
Accreditation